The Albert Lasker Special Achievement Award is one of the four Lasker Awards given by the Lasker Foundation for medical research in the United States. The first award was given in 1994; it is not awarded every year. In 2008, the award was renamed the Lasker-Koshland Special Achievement Award in Medical Science in honor of Daniel E. Koshland Jr.

Recipients
Source: The Lasker Foundation - Awards
 1994: Maclyn McCarty
 1996: Paul Zamecnik
 1997: Victor A. McKusick
 1998: Daniel E. Koshland Jr.
 1999: Seymour S. Kety
 2000: Sydney Brenner
 2002: James E. Darnell
 2004: Matthew Meselson
 2006: Joseph G. Gall
 2008: Stanley Falkow
 2010: David Weatherall
 2012: Donald D. Brown and Tom Maniatis
 2014: Mary-Claire King
 2016: Bruce M. Alberts
 2018: Joan Argetsinger Steitz
 2021: David Baltimore

See also

 List of medicine awards

External links
 - Official site

References

Awards established in 1994
Laskey-Koshland
American awards
Lasker Award
1994 establishments in the United States